John Joseph Allen Jr. (November 27, 1899 – March 7, 1995) was the U.S. representative from California's 7th congressional district from January 3, 1947 to January 3, 1959. He is the last Republican to represent Oakland and Berkeley in Congress.

He served as Under Secretary of Commerce for Transportation under President Dwight D. Eisenhower from 1959 to 1961, helping to lay the groundwork for the future Department of Transportation.

He retired to McCall, Idaho in 1970, where he later served as mayor from 1988 to 1992.  During this time he was America's oldest mayor.

Early life and education 
John J. Allen Jr. was born to John J. Allen Sr., an Alameda County Judge, in Oakland, California, on November 27, 1899.

Allen Jr. graduated from public high school and while studying at Berkeley joined the United States Navy as an Apprentice seaman during World War I.

Career 
After graduating from UC Berkeley School of Law in 1922, Allen Jr. was admitted to the California State Bar and commenced practice. Between 1923–1943 Allen Jr. served as a member of the Oakland Board of Education, serving several terms as president. He also served as the President of the California State School Trustees Association from 1936–1938, and as a member of the County Republican Central Committee from 1936–1944.

In 1942, during World War II, Allen Jr. returned to the Navy, this time serving as a Lieutenant commander. He was discharged in 1945.

After his military service, Allen Jr. served as the Vice-Chairman for the State Commission on School Districts, and in 1946 ran for Congress in California's 7th Congressional District after the retirement of Congressman John H. Tolan. Allen Jr. beat Democrat Patrick W. McDonough by 13,520 votes. Allen voted in favor of the Civil Rights Act of 1957.

After his unsuccessful re-election bid, Allen Jr. was appointed as the Under Secretary of Commerce for Transportation on January 5, 1959, serving until 1961.

Later life 
After his political career ended in 1961, John J. Allen Jr. resumed the practice of law until his retirement in 1969. He resided in McCall, Idaho, and at the age of 87 he was elected Mayor of McCall, serving until his death in 1995.

References

1899 births
1995 deaths
20th-century American politicians
20th-century American lawyers
Idaho Republicans
Lawyers from Oakland, California
Mayors of places in Idaho
Military personnel from California
People from McCall, Idaho
Politicians from Oakland, California
Republican Party members of the United States House of Representatives from California
School board members in California
UC Berkeley School of Law alumni
United States Navy officers
United States Navy personnel of World War I
United States Navy personnel of World War II
United States Under Secretaries of Commerce